Eugene Birminghouse Elliott (February 8, 1889 – January 5, 1976) was a  Major League Baseball outfielder. Ellitott played for the New York Highlanders in the  season. In 5 career games, he had 1 hit, in 13 at-bats, a .077 batting average. He batted left and threw right-handed.

Elloitt was born in Fayette County, Pennsylvania and died in Huntingdon, Pennsylvania.

External links
Baseball Reference.com page

1889 births
1976 deaths
New York Yankees players
Major League Baseball outfielders
Baseball players from Pennsylvania
Minor league baseball managers
McKeesport Tubers players
Bradenton Growers players
Orlando Tigers players
Orlando Bulldogs players